Tópaga is a town and municipality in the Sugamuxi Province, part of the Colombian department of Boyacá. It borders Nobsa and Corrales in the west, in the east Mongua and Gámeza, in the north Gámeza and in the south Monguí and Sogamoso. Chicamocha River flows through Tópaga.

Etymology 
The name Tópaga comes from Chibcha and means "Behind father river".

History 
Before the Spanish conquest, Tópaga was inhabited by the Muisca. The village was ruled by a cacique with the same name as the village, loyal to the iraca of Sugamuxi. The iraca was educated by messenger god Bochica according to the religion of the Muisca.

Modern Tópaga was founded in 1593 by Álvaro Leiva.

Economy 
Main economical activity of Tópaga is coal mining, used to produce electrical energy.

Gallery

Panorama

References 

Municipalities of Boyacá Department
Populated places established in 1593
1593 establishments in the Spanish Empire
Muisca Confederation
Muysccubun